Kenneth Welburn (born third quarter 1929) was an English professional rugby league footballer who played in the 1940s and 1950s.

Playing career
Welburn made his début for Featherstone Rovers on Saturday 20 November 1948.

Genealogical information
Ken Welburn's marriage to Mary H. was registered during first quarter 1957 in Pontefract district.

References

1929 births
English rugby league players
Featherstone Rovers captains
Featherstone Rovers players
place of death missing
Rugby league props
year of death missing